is a Japanese football player currently playing for Kataller Toyama.

Club career stats
Updated to 28 February 2019.

References

External links
Profile at V-Varen Nagasaki

Profile at Ventforet Kofu

1989 births
Living people
Association football people from Miyazaki Prefecture
Japanese footballers
J1 League players
J2 League players
Cerezo Osaka players
V-Varen Nagasaki players
Ventforet Kofu players
Kyoto Sanga FC players
Kataller Toyama players
Asian Games medalists in football
Footballers at the 2010 Asian Games
Asian Games gold medalists for Japan
Association football midfielders
Medalists at the 2010 Asian Games